The Prevention of Crime Act 1953 (C.14) is an Act of the Parliament of the United Kingdom that restricts the carrying of offensive weapons in public. The Act was passed in response to the large rise in violent crime in the United Kingdom, with 800 cases of armed robbery, assault with intent to rob or robbery with violence and 4,445 cases of malicious wounding in 1951 (the last year up to that point with such statistics) while many of these crimes did not include the use of weapons there were calls from politicians, police officers and members of the public for new laws to combat the problem by restricting civilian weapons. Prior to the act it was not a crime to carry a weapon in a public place for offensive or defensive purposes (though carrying or using a weapon during the commission of a crime would earn a greater punishment) unless it was a firearm or imitation firearm. The Prevention of Crime Act was created to under the presumption that banning weapons from all civilians, regardless of their intention, from public places would reduce violent crime, receiving the Royal Assent on 6 May 1953 and coming into force on 6 June. No subsequent studies were carried out afterwards to ascertain what effect, if any, the act had on crime.

Under the original Act, all weapons carried by civilians would be deemed to be offensive weapons (except those persons who were deemed to have a reasonable excuse to have a weapon for self-defence by the courts), persons found in a public place carrying an offensive weapon commits a criminal offence punishable by up to 2 years in prison. A public place includes highways and anywhere to which the public could regularly have access – such as post offices and train stations. The Act makes certain attempts to define an offensive weapon, dividing it into three categories: "articles made for causing injury to the person", such as knuckledusters and batons; "articles adapted for use for causing injury", such as a sock with a brick in it; and "articles intended for use for causing injury to the person", which would include normal, day-to-day items such as scissors. For a conviction under the third category, the prosecution must show evidence that the defendant was intending to use it as an offensive weapon. There is a defence if the defendant had "lawful authority or a reasonable excuse" for carrying the instrument. The onus to provide a reasonable excuse is on the defendant, which is unusual since English criminal law has a principle that defendants are "innocent until proven guilty". Despite the carrying of an offensive weapon in a public place being a criminal offence, suspected offenders are given the ability to raise a defence on the civil burden of proof, i.e. on the balance of probabilities. This defence is that the offender, on the balance of probabilities, had lawful authority or reasonable excuse for having the weapon in public.

References

Bibliography
Primary Sources

Secondary Sources

External links

United Kingdom Acts of Parliament 1953